Monument Rocks may refer to:

Places

Antarctica
Monument Rocks (Antarctica), a group of rocks lying of the coast of the Antarctic Peninsula.

United States
Monument Rocks (Kansas), a series of large chalk formations in Gove County, Kansas.
Monument Rock Wilderness, a wilderness area within the Blue Mountains of eastern Oregon.